J. Chris Griffin is an American record producer and mix engineer living in New York City, operating from a private studio at The Engine Room Audio in the Financial District, Manhattan.

Griffin has worked on records with a number of popular artists, including Madonna, Kanye West, John Legend, Missy Elliott, Janet Jackson, The Corrs, Mis-Teeq, JoJo, and John McLaughlin. Griffin has also worked with Raquel Castro of NBC's The Voice, GLEEs Charice, Christian group Big Tent Revival and others.

His personal works can be found throughout network television on prime-time shows in the United States, Australia, United Kingdom, South Africa, Norway, Sweden, Denmark and Mexico. Some major programs featuring his tracks are CBS's NCIS, NBC's Dateline and MTV's original Made.

In addition to making records, Griffin was also a Pro-Reviewer for Broadjam, a site where artists have the opportunity to collaborate, interact, and receive feedback from other artists. Griffin also conducts private vocal coachings within his studio, prepping young artists for auditions, recording sessions, and live shows, and instructs a recording technology class at New York University's Steinhardt School of Culture, Education, and Human Development.

Griffin globally represents Auto-Tune, Propellerhead, AVID, and Sibelius as an artist and clinician and has released products paired with M-Audio. Prior engagements include the Monterey Jazz Festival, Luthman Scandinavia Tour and the Main Stage at Winter NAMM 2007 and 2008.

Artists produced / mixed / engineered
 Kanye West
 John Legend
 Josh London
 Madonna
 Missy Elliott
 Janet Jackson
 John McLaughlin
 JoJo
 The Corrs
 Mis-Teeq
 Nathan Leigh Jones
 Rachel Panay
 Danielle Bollinger
 Osha Kai
 Pepper Mache
 Georgie Porgie
 Simone Denney
 Natalia
 Josh Harris
 Cheryl Engelhardt
 LHS Jazz Ensemble
 The New Empires
 Raquel Castro
 Charice
Robin Tucker

Television
 CBS's NCIS
 NBC's Dateline
 MTV's Made
 MSNBC's MSNBC Investigates
 America's Most Wanted
 Prime-time shows in US, Australia, Europe, South Africa, and Mexico

Sound design
 McDSP
 Propellerheads
 M-Audio
 Ultimate Sound Bank
 Reason

References

External links
www.jchrisgriffin.com (official site)
The Engine Room

Record producers from Georgia (U.S. state)
Living people
People from Valdosta, Georgia
Year of birth missing (living people)